Gísli is an Icelandic and Faroese masculine given name. Gisle is the Norwegian variant of the name. Notable people with the name include:

 Gisli Sursson, the protagonist of Gísla saga
 Gisli (contemporary musician), Icelandic solo musician, singer-songwriter and multi-instrumentalist
 Gísli Guðjónsson (born 1947), Icelandic scientist
 Gísli Halldórsson (1927–1998), Icelandic actor of theatre, radio, film and television
 Gísli Pálsson (born 1949), Icelandic anthropologist and author

Icelandic masculine given names
Faroese masculine given names